Archibald Barton (1862 – after 1889) was an English professional footballer who played in the Football Alliance for Small Heath. Barton was born in the Moseley district of Birmingham and played local football for Coles Farm Unity before joining Small Heath. He played competitively only once for the club, in the opening game of the 1889–90 season, deputising at right-back when Fred Speller was switched to the left in the absence of Walter Gittins. Barton died in Birmingham.

References

1862 births
Year of death missing
Footballers from Birmingham, West Midlands
English footballers
Association football fullbacks
Birmingham City F.C. players
Football Alliance players
Date of birth missing